Borislav Novachkov (born 29 November 1989) is a Bulgarian American freestyle wrestler. Competing for Bulgaria in the 65 kg division he won a bronze medal at the 2014 European Championships. He was eliminated in the second bout at the 2016 Olympics.

Novachkov qualified for the 2016 Summer Olympics in the 65 kg freestyle class by winning a last-chance qualifier in Turkey. He wrestled collegiately at Cal Poly San Luis Obispo, where he won Pac-12 titles in 2010 and 2011 and was a three-time All-American (seventh in 2010, runner-up in 2011, third in 2012). He wrestled for Fremont High School in Sunnyvale, CA where he was a two-time CIF California state champion. He also won two Central Coast Section Championships after finishing 2nd as a sophomore. Novachkov moved from Bulgaria to Sunnyvale, California, as an 8th grader, but was enrolled in high school a year early in order to keep him at the same school as his elder brother Filip Novachkov. Filip is also a California State Wrestling Champion and NCAA Qualifier for Cal Poly. Boris holds dual citizenship in the United States and Bulgaria, but chose to compete for his birth country.

Novachkov studied biokinetics at the California Polytechnic State University, where he was named Male Athlete of the Year in 2011. Together with his brother he runs the company Bulgarian Muscle, which provides wrestling training and medical services. In 2012 he also started working as an assistant wrestling coach at the University of Illinois Urbana-Champaign. He currently trains at Stanford University at the California Regional Training Center

He now trains and helps run the wrestling program at odyssey fitness in the Lake of the Ozarks in Missouri and fights professionally in mma and is currently 2-1 in his mma career.

References

External links
 

1989 births
Living people
Olympic wrestlers of Bulgaria
European Games competitors for Bulgaria
Wrestlers at the 2015 European Games
Wrestlers at the 2016 Summer Olympics
Bulgarian male sport wrestlers
European Wrestling Championships medalists
People from Radnevo